In computer hardware, a caddy is a container used to hold some medium, such as a CD-ROM.  If the medium is a hard disk drive, the caddy is also referred to as a disk enclosure. Its functionality is similar to that of the 3.5" floppy disk's jacket.

The purpose of a disk caddy is to protect the disk from damage when handling; its use dates back to at least the Capacitance Electronic Disc in 1976, and they were used in initial versions of Blu-ray Discs, though as a cost-saving measure newer versions use hard-coating technology to prevent scratches and do not need a caddy.

Caddies may be an integral part of the medium, as in some DVD-RAM discs, or separately attached.

Examples 

Caddies date at least to the Capacitance Electronic Disc, which used a caddy from 1976 to protect the grooves of the disc.

While caddies have become obsolete, some websites still sell them, although they have become quite expensive.

Cartridges 

In addition to caddies that serve purely a storage purpose, there are also ones that are designed to be loaded directly for data access, usually via a shutter.

Some early CD-ROM drives used a mechanism where CDs had to be inserted into special cartridges, somewhat similar in appearance to a jewel case. Although the idea behind this—a tougher plastic shell to protect the disc from damage—was sound, it did not gain wide acceptance among disc manufacturers. Consumers also eschewed the intended and pricey use, which required each disc to be protected with a caddy for its full useful life, preferring to only buy one caddy and transfer the discs between their traditional storage jewel cases and the caddy when in use, then the reverse when finished.

Drives that used the caddy format required "bare" discs to be placed into a caddy before use, making them less convenient to use. Drives that worked this way were referred to as caddy drives or caddy load(ing), but from about 1994 most computer manufacturers moved to tray-loading,  or slot-loading drives.

The same system is still available for more recent formats such as DVD-RAMs but is not common.

The PlayStation Portable, UMD disc is a similar concept, using a small proprietary DVD-type disc, in a fixed unopenable caddy as both a copy protection and damage prevention measure.

The MiniDisc is a similar concept again, using a small proprietary Magneto-optical type disc instead, also in a fixed unopenable caddy.

References 

Computer storage media